Philip Gawdy (13 July 1562 –  27 May 1617) was an English landowner and letter writer.

Career
Philip Gawdy was the son of Bassingbourne Gawdy, senior, and Anne Wotton. In 1588 his father married Margaret Syliard, widow of Thomas Darcy of Tolleshunt Darcy. He was the younger brother of Bassingbourne Gawdy, junior, who married Anne Framlingham, of Crows Hall, Debenham, in 1586.

At first Philip Gawdy studied law in London, and looked for opportunities at the royal court. He wrote to his parents with news including the appointment of Amias Paulet as a commissioner for peace in the Netherlands, and competition for the shrievalties of Norfolk and Suffolk, and news of the conflict in Ireland.

In 1591 he joined the crew of the Revenge commanded by Sir Richard Grenville in a small fleet under Lord Thomas Howard. After encountering the Spanish at the Battle of Flores (1591), Gawdy was captured and imprisoned in Lisbon at São Jorge Castle. He was released after undertaking to pay £200 in an exchange of prisoners.

Gawdy's relatives in Norfolk asked him to commission clothes in the latest London fashion for them, including hats and a farthingale. 

In later years, Philip mostly lived at West Harling. In 1605 his nephew, Bassingbourne junior's son, Framlingham Gawdy, had an unsuitable affair or involvement with a Mistress Havers, according to the report of Elizabeth Kitson. Philip Gawdy took him to London, showing him the lions at the Tower of London, the royal tombs at Westminster Abbey, and the court, where his "cousins" Mary Gargrave and Elizabeth Southwell (1584–1631), the latter from nearby Woodrising, Norfolk, were maids of honour to Anne of Denmark.

Gawdy married Bridget (died 1609), daughter of Bartholomew Strangman of Hadleigh, Essex.

Letters and papers
Gawdy's letters are held by the British Library. There are extensive archives of the Gawdy family.

References

1562 births
1617 deaths
People from Harling, Norfolk